In differential geometry, flat map is a mapping that converts vectors into corresponding 1-forms, given a non-degenerate (0,2)-tensor.

See also
Flat morphism
Sharp map, the mapping that converts 1-forms into corresponding vectors
bind, another name for flatMap in functional programming

Differential geometry